Lisa Beyer is vice president of communications at the International AIDS Vaccine Initiative (IAVI).  Prior to joining IAVI, Beyer was assistant managing editor at Time magazine until early 2007.

Career
Beyer began her career as an editor for the Daily Texan while also working part-time for the Austin American-Statesman. She began working for TIME magazine as a staff writer in 1988.

Beyer served as Time bureau chief in Jerusalem  for much of the time between the two Persian Gulf Wars. During her time here she interviewed Yasser Arafat, Yitzhak Rabin, Benjamin Netanyahu, and Ehud Barak. In 2000, she left Jerusalem to begin working in New York City as a Senior Editor for TIME magazine.

Awards and honors
In 1983, Beyer was awarded a Henry Luce Scholarship where she was able to travel to Hong Kong working for Asiaweek as a staff writer.

Personal
A native of Lafayette Parish, Louisiana, Beyer has also lived in Austin, Texas, Hong Kong, Singapore and now resides in New York City.

She was Ze'ev Chafets's third wife and they had two children.

Appearances
On April 16, 2002, she appeared on The Daily Show with Jon Stewart.

Education
Beyer is a journalism graduate of the University of Texas at Austin.

References

Living people
Year of birth missing (living people)